Roger Moen (born 11 April 1966, in Fetsund) is a Norwegian retired auto racing driver. He is best known for his two different spells racing in the British Touring Car Championship. He first raced in British Saloons, winning his class in the National Saloon 2000 championship with seven wins in 1996, and finished as runner-up in 1997.

In 1998 he drove in the BTCC for the Michelin Cup for Independents, in a Honda Accord for Mardi Gras Motorsport. He drove in the first fourteen of the twenty-six rounds, finishing fifth in the independents cup and twenty-first overall with one championship point. He returned to the BTCC in 2001, racing a full season in the production class for HTML in a Peugeot 306. He ended the year finishing third in class and became the first ever Production Class entry to win the race overall, in round nineteen at Oulton Park, when the Production Class cars had a one lap head start on the Touring Class. In 2003 he competed in the Swedish Touring Car Championship.

Racing record

Complete 24 Hours of Spa results

Complete British Touring Car Championship results
(key) Races in bold indicate pole position (1 point awarded all races, 2001 in class) Races in italics indicate fastest lap (1 point awarded - 2001 only in class) * signifies that driver lead feature race for at least one lap (1 point awarded - 2001 only in class)

References

External links
 BTCC Pages Profile.

Norwegian racing drivers
British Touring Car Championship drivers
1966 births
Living people
Swedish Touring Car Championship drivers